The 2020 Hooters 250 was a NASCAR Xfinity Series race held on June 13, 2020 at Homestead–Miami Speedway in Homestead, Florida. Contested over 167 laps on the  oval, it was the ninth race of the 2020 NASCAR Xfinity Series season and the first of two races for the Xfinity Series at Homestead. Joe Gibbs Racing's Harrison Burton won his second race of the season and became the track's youngest series race winner.

The race was originally scheduled to be held on March 21, but was rescheduled due to the COVID-19 pandemic.

Report

Background 

Homestead-Miami Speedway is a motor racing track located in Homestead, Florida. The track, which has several configurations, has promoted several series of racing, including NASCAR, the NTT IndyCar Series and the Grand-Am Rolex Sports Car Series

From 2002 to 2019, Homestead-Miami Speedway has hosted the final race of the season in all three of NASCAR's series: the NASCAR Cup Series, Xfinity Series and Gander RV & Outdoors Truck Series.

The race was held without fans in attendance due to the ongoing COVID-19 pandemic.

Entry list 

 (R) denotes rookie driver.
 (i) denotes driver who is ineligible for series driver points.

Qualifying 
Harrison Burton was awarded the pole for the race as determined by a random draw.

Starting lineup

Race

Race results

Stage Results 
Stage One

Laps: 40

Stage Two

Laps: 40

Final Stage Results 

Laps: 87

 † = Damaged Vehicle Policy

Race statistics 

 Lead changes: 18 among 7 different drivers
 Cautions/Laps: 5 for 25
 Red flags: 0
 Time of race: 2 hours, 6 minutes, 34 seconds
 Average speed:

Media

Television 
The Hooters 250 was carried by FOX in the United States. Adam Alexander, Stewart-Haas Racing driver Clint Bowyer, and Jamie McMurray called the race from the Fox Sports Studio in Charlotte, with Regan Smith covering pit road.

Radio 
The Motor Racing Network (MRN) called the race for radio, which was simulcast on SiriusXM NASCAR Radio. Mike Bagley and Alex Hayden anchored the action from the booth. Dave Moody called the race from turns 1 & 2 and Jeff Striegle called the action through turns 3 & 4. NASCAR Hall of Fame Executive Director Winston Kelley and Steve Post provided reports from pit road.

Standings after the race 

 Drivers' Championship standings

 Note: Only the first 12 positions are included for the driver standings.
 . – Driver has clinched a position in the NASCAR playoffs.

References 

2020 NASCAR Xfinity Series
Hooters 250
NASCAR races at Homestead-Miami Speedway
2020 in sports in Florida
Hooters 250